Kenneth O. Hanson (1922 – November 28, 2003 in Athens, Greece) was an American teacher, translator, and poet.

Works
 
 
 
 Growing Old Alive Copper Canyon Press 1978

Anthologies
 Norton Anthology of Poets in 1979

References

External links
 Stuart A. Rose Manuscript, Archives, and Rare Book Library

University of Idaho alumni
University of Washington College of Arts and Sciences alumni
Reed College faculty
American male poets
2003 deaths
1922 births
20th-century American poets
20th-century American male writers
American expatriates in Greece